The Caland system is a set of rules in the reconstructed Proto-Indo-European language which describes how certain words, typically adjectives, are derived from one another. It was named after Dutch Indologist Willem Caland (1859-1932), who first formulated part of the system. 

The cognates derived from these roots in different daughter languages often do not agree in formation, but show certain characteristic properties:
Adjectives are formed using zero-ablaut ro-stems (i.e., word stems ending in *-ro), u-stems, or amphikinetic nt-stems.
Adjectives are sometimes formed using i-stems, especially in the first part of a compound.
Corresponding stative verbs in  often exist.

Examples

Example 1
 'light (in weight)':
ro-stems: Ancient Greek elaphrós 'light, quick'; Old High German lungar 'fast'
u-stems: Ancient Greek elakhús 'small'; Sanskrit laghú-, raghú- 'quick, light, small'; Avestan ragu- 'fast'; Latin levis 'light' < ; Lithuanian lengvùs 'light'; Old Church Slavonic легъкъ (legŭkŭ) 'light'

Example 2
 'white':
ro-stems: Ancient Greek argós < *argrós 'white'; Sanskrit  'brilliant'
u-stems: Tocharian B ārkwi 'white'
i-stems: Ancient Greek argi-kéraunos 'with bright lightning'
nt-stems: Old Irish argat, Old Welsh argant, Latin argentum

Example 3
 'red':
ro-stems: Ancient Greek eruthrós 'red'; Latin ruber 'red'; Tocharian B ratre 'red'; Old East Slavic родръ (rodrŭ) 'red'
i-stems: Sanskrit rudhiras (mixed with ro-stem)
-eh₁ verbs: Latin rubeō 'be red', Old High German rōtēn 'shine red'; Old East Slavic ръдѣти сѧ (rŭděti sę) 'become red, be red'

Example 4
 'high':
ro-stems: Tocharian B pärkare 'high'
u-stems: Hittite parku- 'high'; Armenian  'high' < 
i-stems: Avestan bǝrǝzi- 'high' in compounds
nt-stems: Sanskrit bṛhánt- 'high', Avestan bǝrǝzant- 'high', Germanic name Burgund-, Irish name Brigit, Tocharian A koṃ-pärkānt 'sunrise'

Example 5
 'deep':
ro-stems: Tocharian B tapre 'high' < 
u-stems: Lithuanian dubùs 'hollow'

References

Indo-European linguistics